The 2018–19 Biathlon IBU Cup was a multi-race tournament over a season of biathlon, organised by the International Biathlon Union. IBU Cup is the second-rank competition in biathlon after the Biathlon World Cup. The season started on 26 November 2018 in Idre, Sweden and ended on 16 March 2019 in Martell-Val Martello, Italy. The defending overall champions from the 2017–18 Biathlon IBU Cup were Vetle Sjåstad Christiansen from Norway and Karolin Horchler from Germany.

Calendar
Below is the IBU Cup calendar for the 2018–19 season.

Notes
 All European Championships races included in the IBU Cup total score.
 Super sprint races were included in the sprint total score.

IBU Cup podiums

Men

Women

Mixed

Standings (men)

Overall 

Final standings after 23 races.

Individual 

Final standings after 3 races.

Sprint 

Final standings after 14 races.

Pursuit 

Final standings after 5 races.

Mixed relay 

Final standings after 6 races.

Nation 

Final standings after 23 races.

Standings (women)

Overall 

Final standings after 23 races.

Individual 

Final standings after 3 races.

Sprint 

Final standings after 14 races.

Pursuit 

Final standings after 5 races.

Mixed relay 

Final standings after 6 races.

Nation 

Final standings after 23 races.

Medal table

References

External links
IBU official site

IBU Cup
2018 in biathlon
2019 in biathlon